María Francisca Rosa Merino Garrido (born 9 May 1973), known as Pancha Merino, is a Chilean actress and television presenter.

Biography
Francisca Merino started appearing in commercials at age 14 and has been financially independent ever since.

She made her acting debut in 1995 on the Canal 13 telenovela , but she achieved greater popularity the following year when she portrayed Cathy Winter, the protagonist of Adrenalina.

In 1999, she starred with Jorge Zabaleta in the TV series Cerro Alegre, playing Beatriz León Thompson, a young upper-class woman in the city of Viña del Mar.

In theater she joined the cast of Te vas a morir de pena cuando yo no esté, one of the most notable productions of the 2002 Santiago a Mil International Theater Festival. She would return to work with both of them in the 2011 play Infierno Beach.

In 2005 she appeared in the film The Last Moon by director Miguel Littín, where she was a castmate of Alejandro Goic and Tamara Acosta.

Merino's extroverted personality led to her being a frequent guest on television programs. But it was only in 2008 that she agreed to work on a series: . Appearing on the variety show exposed a side of her that often drew laughter but also controversy. After spending six years on Chilevisión, where she was also a juror of the Viña del Mar Festival, her contract was not renewed.

In December 2015, after being away from television, the morning show Bienvenidos, led by Tonka Tomicic and Martín Cárcamo, recruited her to be a panelist. She said she accepted that proposal because a morning show is a friendly format and is not exposed to the discussions that often occur in an entertainment show.

Although Chilevisión decided to let her go in 2014, in 2016 she was called on to reinforce  due to the lukewarm ratings that it was receiving. In an unprecedented event in the television industry, Merino, with a contract on Canal 13, managed to work on two channels at the same time.

Personal life
Francisca Merino is a Buddhist, and took refuge in the Three Jewels on a trip to India. She asserts that in show business she represents a "character", and that in her personal life she is not like that. In 2001 Merino married commercial engineer Claudio Labbé, from whom she separated in 2016. She has three children: Dominic, Amanda (goddaughter of screenwriter Pablo Illanes), and Chloé (goddaughter of actor Andrés Gómez).

Controversy
On 9 April 2014, the SQP program discussed the performance of singer Ana Tijoux at the Lollapalooza festival, where some young people in the audience shouted cara de nana (housemaid face) to the artist. When it was Francisca Merino's turn to comment on the news, she said "Nana's face, but pretty." This drew the anger of comedian Pedro Ruminot, SQPs guest that day, who questioned her for what she had just said. Merino replied "you are angry because you are also dark. Better bring me a little cup of coffee." Later the actress was suspended for more than a week of television, and on her return to SQP'' on 15 May 2014, she made public apologies, saying it was a bad joke. However, Chilevisión was reprimanded in August for "prejudices of a social nature". In the end, Merino did not continue on Chilevisión and said she did not want to return to the show.

Filmography

Film

Series and specials

Telenovelas

Programs

References

External links
 

1973 births
20th-century Chilean actresses
21st-century Chilean actresses
Actresses from Santiago
Chilean Buddhists
Chilean film actresses
Chilean telenovela actresses
Chilean television presenters
Living people
Chilean women television presenters
Chilean television personalities